The Tuvalu national football team represents the country of Tuvalu in international association football. It is fielded by the Tuvalu National Football Association, the governing body of football in Tuvalu, and competes as an associate member of the Oceania Football Confederation (OFC), which encompasses the countries of Oceania. Tuvalu played their first international match on 30 August 1979 in a 18–0 loss to Tahiti in Suva.

Tuvalu have competed in the Pacific Games and Pacific Mini Games, and all players who have played in at least one match, either as a member of the starting eleven or as a substitute, are listed below. Each player's details include his playing position while with the team, the number of caps earned and goals scored in all international matches, and details of the first and most recent matches played in. The names are initially ordered by number of caps (in descending order), then by date of debut, then by alphabetical order. All statistics are correct up to and including the match played on 18 July 2019.

Key

Players

References

Tuvalu international footballers
Association football player non-biographical articles